Charles Webb was a New Zealand rugby league footballer who represented New Zealand .

Playing career
A halfback from the Ponsonby United club, Webb also represented Auckland. In 5 seasons with them he made 34 appearances for them.

In 1912, Webb was named in the New Zealand team to tour Australia however he was unable to travel. He did however make his debut for New Zealand in their match with Auckland prior to the tour. He scored a try in a 38-16 win.

Later that year, New South Wales made a return tour to New Zealand. Webb captained the New Zealand side that played against them, losing 10-18. He also played in two matches for Auckland against the touring Blues side.

Webb was selected for the 1913 tour of Australia, but withdrew from the side again.

In 1914, the Great Britain Lions toured New Zealand and Webb played for Auckland in a match against them.

References

New Zealand rugby league players
New Zealand national rugby league team players
Auckland rugby league team players
Rugby league halfbacks
Ponsonby Ponies players
Year of birth missing
Place of birth missing
Year of death missing